The Monsanto Years is a studio album by Canadian singer-songwriter Neil Young and the American rock group Promise of the Real, released on June 29, 2015 on Reprise Records.  A concept album which criticizes the agribusiness company Monsanto, it is Young's thirty-fifth studio album and the third by Promise of the Real.  The group is fronted by Lukas Nelson and features his brother Micah, both sons of Willie Nelson.

The album was produced by both Young and John Hanlon, and is accompanied by a film documenting the recording process.

Recording and release
Young had a long-time friendship with Willie Nelson and his sons, Lukas and Micah and jammed with Lukas' bandmates in Lukas Nelson & Promise of the Real after 2014's Farm Aid. Recording for this album began the following January. Young announced that he was recording an album with the band—including non-member Micah—at a converted movie theater Teatro in Oxnard, California, the site where Willie Nelson's Teatro album was recorded. Young sent a CD to his collaborators with demos to allow them to learn some of the new songs before arriving to perform together on the new compositions.

The recording was filmed by Don Hannah alongside live rehearsals in April 2015 for a film also entitled The Monsanto Years.

Young debuted a music video for "Wolf Moon" on June 10, 2015.

Reception

Critical
In a highly positive review, The Guardian'''s Jon Dennis gave the album five stars out of five. Praising the contributions of Promise of the Real, Dennis wrote: [The band] sound not unlike Crazy Horse, and supply all the big riffs, crashing major chords and harmonies that have characterised Young’s best records for five decades." Zach Schonfeld of The A.V. Club gave the album a "C" rating, opining that the concept of the album and its execution were "underproduced, underwritten, and not likely to take up more than a few months (if not weeks or days) of Young's promotional energies before he moves to the next thing" but with some highlights among the harder rock songs. Thomas Erlewine of Allmusic.com gave the album 3.5 stars out of 5 claiming that: "Young uses his sturdy footing to lash out at what he perceives as destructive forces -- to our dinner tables and social fabric -- and if the individual message may wind up fading like yesterday's newspapers, the music will keep The Monsanto Years burning bright". An Associated Press review of the album argued that Young's criticisms of corporate greed descend into preachiness, saying Young's anger is "so real that it could be tasted, but there is something discomfiting about Young positioning himself as an all-knowing seer, putting people down for wanting simpler, cheerier songs."Billboard solicited the opinions of corporations criticized on the album, including Monsanto, whose representative said: "Many of us at Monsanto have been and are fans of Neil Young. Unfortunately, for some of us, his current album may fail to reflect our strong beliefs in what we do every day to help make agriculture more sustainable. We recognize there is a lot of misinformation about who we are and what we do—and unfortunately several of those myths seem to be captured in these lyrics." Notably all the corporations mentioned in album lyrics except for Chevron provided their responses for the request to comment on the album songs. Reacting to the "Big Box" track Walmart said: "As you might have seen recently, Walmart raised its lowest starting wage to $9 an hour. We’re proud of the opportunity we provide people to build a career and have a chance at a better life." Starbucks commented on "A Rock Star Bucks a Coffee Shop" track: "Starbucks has not taken a position on the issue of GMO [genetically modified organism] labeling. As a company with stores and a product presence in every state, we prefer a national solution."

Commercial
The album debuted at  No. 21 on the Billboard 200 albums chart on its first week of release, selling around 18,000 copies in the United States in its first week. It also debuted at No. 4 on Billboards Rock Albums chart.  and No. 2 on the Folk Albums chart. As of June 2016, the album has sold 41,000 copies in the US.

Monsanto
Criticism of the company led Monsanto to investigate Young and write an internal memo on his social media activity and music.

Track listing

Personnel
 Neil Young – vocals, guitar, production
 Lukas Nelson – guitar, backing vocals
 Micah Nelson – electric guitar, electric charango, backing vocals
 Corey McCormick – bass guitar, backing vocals
 Tato Melgar – percussion
 Anthony Logerfo – drumsTechnical personnel Johnnie Burik – assistant engineering
 Alberto Hernandez – assistant engineering
 John Hanlon – production, engineering
 John Hausmann – stage and monitor engineering
 Chris Kasych – stage and monitor engineering
 Keith "Moby" Lanoux – guitar tech
 Bob Ludwig – mastering
 Jeff Pinn – engineering
 Jimmy Sloan – assistant engineering, production coordinationArtwork'''
 Neil Young, Lukas Nelson, Corey McCormick, Tato Melgar, Anthony Logerfo – cover design
 Micah Nelson – cover painting, DVD label art, cover design
 Gary Burden – art direction
 Howard Chandler Christy – booklet painting
 Jenice Heo – art direction
 Eric Johnson – cover art, lettering
 Other Shoe Photography – booklet cover photography

Charts

References

2015 albums
Neil Young albums
Albums produced by Neil Young
Reprise Records albums
Concept albums
Works about Monsanto
Criticism of science
Genetically modified organisms in agriculture
Albums produced by John Hanlon
Lukas Nelson & Promise of the Real albums